Caenis latipennis is a species of small squaregilled mayfly in the family Caenidae. It is found in Central America, North America. In North America its range includes all of Canada, all of Mexico, and the continental United States.

References

Mayflies
Articles created by Qbugbot
Insects described in 1907